Mansoor is a 2017 Nigerian drama film directed by Ali Nuhu and produced by Naziru Danhajiya. The film stars Umar M Shareef in the titular role with Maryam Yahya, Ali Nuhu, Abba Elmustapha, and Baballe Hayatu in supporting roles.

The film received mostly positive critics acclaim and screened worldwide. The film won the award for the Best Indigenous Movie of the Year in Hausa Category at the Africa Magic Viewers' Choice Awards 2018, (AMVCA). Lead actress Maryam Yahaya was nominated as Best Promising Actress by City People Entertainment Awards in 2017.

Cast
 Umar M Shareef as Mansoor
 Maryam Yahya as Maryam
 Ali Nuhu
 Abba Elmustapha
 Baballe Hayatu
 Sadiq Ahmad
 Teema Yola
 Nabila Mohd Zain
 Garzali Miko
 Ahmed Bello
 Jamilu Sani

Awards and nominations

References 

English-language Nigerian films
2017 films
2017 drama films
2010s English-language films